The  is a member of the Cabinet of Japan and is the leader and chief executive of the Ministry of Finance. The minister is also a statutory member of the National Security Council, and is nominated by the Prime Minister of Japan and is appointed by the Emperor of Japan.

Both the current and previous title are translated as "Minister of Finance".

The current minister is Shunichi Suzuki, who took office on 4 October 2021.

List of ministers

Prewar (1900–1946)

Postwar (1946–present)

References